The Very Best of Grateful Dead is a single-CD compilation album chronicling all the years of the San Francisco psychedelic band the Grateful Dead. It is the first release to document every label the band recorded on: Warner Bros. Records, Grateful Dead Records/United Artists Records and Arista Records. It was released on September 16, 2003.

A songbook under the same name was released alongside this album which provides lyrics and musical tablature.

Critical reception

On AllMusic, Stephen Thomas Erlewine said, "The Very Best of Grateful Dead marks the first attempt to do a thorough single-disc overview of the group's career, encompassing not just their classic Warner albums but also the records they cut for their own Grateful Dead/UA and Arista. As always with the Dead, it's hard to condense the band's free-ranging, freewheeling output onto one disc [..] but the 17 tracks here do present nearly all sides of the Dead while hitting their biggest songs. [..] The collection would have been better if sequenced a little more chronologically, but nevertheless it provides a first-class introduction to a band whose catalog can often seem a little unwieldy."

Track listing
"Truckin'" (Jerry Garcia, Robert Hunter, Phil Lesh, Bob Weir) – 5:08
Originally released on the 1970 album American Beauty
"Touch of Grey" (Garcia, Hunter) – 5:50
Originally released on the 1987 album In the Dark
"Sugar Magnolia"  (Hunter, Weir) – 3:19
Originally released on American Beauty
"Casey Jones" (Garcia, Hunter) – 4:28
Originally released on the 1970 album Workingman's Dead
"Uncle John's Band" (Garcia, Hunter) – 4:46
Originally released on Workingman's Dead
"Friend of the Devil" (Dawson, Garcia, Hunter) – 3:24
Originally released on American Beauty
"Franklin's Tower" (Garcia, Hunter, Bill Kreutzmann) – 4:33
Originally released on the 1975 album Blues for Allah
"Estimated Prophet" (John Perry Barlow, Weir) – 5:38
Originally released on the 1977 album Terrapin Station
"Eyes of the World" (Garcia, Hunter) – 5:20
Originally released on the 1973 album Wake of the Flood
"Box of Rain" (Hunter, Lesh) – 5:20
Originally released on American Beauty
"U.S. Blues" (Garcia, Hunter) – 4:40
Originally released on the 1974 album From the Mars Hotel
"The Golden Road (To Unlimited Devotion)" (Garcia) – 2:12
Originally released on the 1967 album The Grateful Dead
"One More Saturday Night" (Weir) – 4:50
Originally released on the 1972 live album Europe '72
"Fire on the Mountain" (Mickey Hart, Hunter) – 3:48
Originally released on the 1978 album Shakedown Street
"The Music Never Stopped" (Barlow, Weir) – 4:35
Originally released on Blues for Allah
"Hell in a Bucket" (Barlow, Weir) – 5:38
Originally released on In the Dark
"Ripple" (Garcia, Hunter) – 4:10
Originally released on American Beauty

Personnel

Grateful Dead
Tom Constanten – keyboards
Jerry Garcia – guitar, pedal steel, vocals
Donna Godchaux – vocals
Keith Godchaux – keyboards
Mickey Hart – drums
Bill Kreutzmann – drums and percussion
Phil Lesh – bass guitar
Ron McKernan – organ on "The Golden Road (To Unlimited Devotion)" and "One More Saturday Night"
Brent Mydland – keyboards
Bob Weir – guitar, vocals

Additional musicians
Jordan Amarantha – percussion on "Fire on the Mountain"
The English Choral – on "Estimated Prophet"
David Grisman – mandolin on "Friend of the Devil" and "Ripple"
John Kahn – horn arrangements on "Fire on the Mountain"
Matthew Kelly – harmonica on "Fire on the Mountain"
David Nelson – electric guitar on "Box of Rain"
The Martyn Ford Orchestra – on "Estimated Prophet"
Merl Saunders – organ on "One More Saturday Night" (later studio overdubs)
Steven Schuster – saxophone on "The Music Never Stopped"
Tom Scott – lyricon and saxophones on "Estimated Prophet"
Dave Torbert – bass guitar on "Box of Rain"
Howard Wales – organ on "Truckin'"

Technical personnel

James Austin – compilation producer
David Lemieux – compilation producer
Cameron Sears – album coordination
Robin Hurley – associate producer
Jimmy Edwards – product manager
Joe Gastwirt – remastering
Gary Peterson – discographical annotation
Vanessa Atkins – editorial supervision
Stanley Mouse – cover art, lettering
Hugh Brown – art direction
Linda Cobb – design
Michael Ochs Archive – photography
Bob Seidemann – photography
 Herb Greene – photography
Bruce Polonsky – photography
Fred Ordower – photography
Hale Milgrim – project assistant
Kevin Gore – project assistant
Scott Pascucci – project assistant
Mark Pinkus – project assistant
Tim Scanlin – project assistant
Steven Chean – project assistant
Dennis McNally – project assistant
Jeffrey Norman – project assistant

Charts
Album - Billboard

 The album debuted on the Billboard 200 album chart on October 4, 2003. It spent 4 weeks on the chart.

References

2003 greatest hits albums
Grateful Dead compilation albums
Rhino Records compilation albums